Mohamed Saïd Raïhani is a Moroccan translator, novelist and short-story writer born on December 23, 1968 in Ksar el Kebir, north of Morocco. He is a member of Moroccan Writers’ Union, holder of a PhD degree in Translation from King Fahd Advanced School of Translation in Tangier/Morocco, an M.A. degree in Creative Writing (English Literature) from Lancaster University (United Kingdom), a second M.A. degree in Translation, Communication & Journalism from  King Fahd Advanced School of Translation and a B.A. degree in English Literature from Abdelmalek Essaadi University in Tétouan/Morocco.

Bibliography

Childhood and early attractions towards arts and literature
Mohamed Saïd Raïhani  was born on Monday December 23, 1968  in Ksar el Kebir (Morocco) where he got his primary and secondary schooling before going to Tetouan north of Morocco to carry on his university studies in English literature.

In his early life, he was fond of  plastic arts but as he could not access Fine Arts School in Tetouan, 130 kilometers away from his hometown, since he was not yet fifteen years old, he shifted to literature, at the age of  sixteen.

When he was sixteen years old, he tried writing his autobiography in French. Yet, on joining the university, he began writing short plays in English, being at that time a great fan of  the Irish famous playwright George Bernard Shaw.

He also tried short story writing as he was fascinated by Ernest Hemingway’s writings.  However, right after his university studies, he joined the sector of National Education as a teacher. on the literary plane,  he shifted right away from writing in English into writing in Arabic, the language of his daily life and his deepest dreams. He, however, kept his love for short story that dates back to his childhood.

In fact, when he was a little boy, a lady who was a friend of his mother’s used to visit them every afternoon to tell them wonderful stories that were nothing but the "Arabian Nights".  To this magic story-teller, he did a very special tribute in the first chapter of his "photo-autobiography" entitled "When Photo Talks".

This lady has kindled his passion for fiction since his very early childhood, enabling him master the craft of telling stories before even learning the literary writing techniques.

First steps towards fictive writing
As far as  writing is concerned, Mohamed Saïd Raïhani admits being very grateful to "Composition", a period he used to like most in the elementary school years.  In periods of "Composition", he felt fully free to write as he pleased and, gradually, he found out his growing inclination towards literary writing.  However, reading books of great writers set his eyes wide open on worldwide literature.

His early readings were guided by nightly television series he used to watch every night. Thus, Les Misérables by Victor Hugo was perhaps his first French-speaking book that he may have chosen with his own hands at the age of thirteen. Thus, late at night, he used to read on paper the same episodes of the series he had watched on TV in the early 1980s.

Early narrative texts
"In Love" and "Open, Sesame!" are Mohamed Saïd Raïhani’s first short stories written by the end of 1991 when he was 23 years old.  "In Love" was not published until fifteen years later.  However, "Open, Sesame!", was published on May 9, 1994 on one of the greatest literary Annexes in the 1990s Morocco, "Bayan Al Yawm Al-Thaqafi".

The central theme in "Open, Sesame!"  is repeated several times in Mohamed Saïd Raïhani’s early short stories: Flood.  "Open, Sesame!"   remains "a short story which invests dream as a narrative technique in a journey from individual dream to the collective one", wrote Moroccan writer Mohamed Aslim in his preface to Mohamed Saïd Raïhani’s first collection of short stories "Waiting For The Morning" published in 2003.

Literary Philosophy
In 2003, Mohamed Saïd Raïhani wrote a short story entitled "The Three Keys" (published in the collection "'Season of Migration to Anywhere", 2006).  This short story "The Three Keys", contains his philosophy related to fiction writing.  "The Three Keys" defends free expression, urges love of the written work and dreams of reaching the real reader.It is a desire to reconcile the text with its free and wild nature:

"When Freedom, says Mohamed Saïd Raïhani in an interview with "Le Matin" a French-speaking daily newspaper, will be the direct background of fiction, Love the storyline  and Dream the dominant form of  narration, only then short story will have taken a wider step to emancipate itself from the present restrains. Yet, writers should realize that Immunity is not necessarily reserved to diplomates but it is also writers' and artists' as well. When writers will realize that and believe in it, they will meet Freedom and will write free texts where they can dream and love to the last dregs."

Literary Works in Arabic 
 Waiting for the Morning (Short Stories) in 2003
 The Season of Migration to Anywhere (Short Stories) in 2006
Death of the Author (Short Stories) in 2010
 A Dialogue between Two Generations (Short Stories) in 2011 (Co-authored with Driss seghir)
 The Enemy of the Sun, the Clown Who turned Out To Be A Monster (Novel)  in 2012
 Behind Every Great Man, There Are Dwarfs (Short Stories) in 2012
 No to Violence (Short Stories) in 2014
 Fifty Short-Shorts: Theme of Freedom (Short short Stories) in 2015

Critical Works in Arabic 
 The Three Keys: An Anthology of Moroccan New Short Story (Vol. 1: "The Key to Dream"), 2006
 The Three Keys: An Anthology of Moroccan New Short Story (Vol. 1: "The Key to Love"), 2007
 The Three Keys: An Anthology of Moroccan New Short Story (Vol. 1: "The Key to Freedom"), 2008

Journalistic Researches & Investigations in Arabic 
 The History of Manipulating Professional Contests in Morocco (Journalistic Investigation) Vol. 1, 2009.
 The History of Manipulating Professional Contests in Morocco (or Letters to the Minister of Education in Morocco) (Journalistic Investigation) Vol. 2, 2011.
 Authenticity of Arab Media Slogan Through the Making of Press Image (Case of Aljazeera Slogan, The Opinion & the Other Opinion), 2015.

Onomastic Researches in Arabic 
The Singularity Will  (A Semiotic Study on First-names) in 2001

Works Translated into English
Waiting for the Morning  (Short Stories), Bloomington (Indiana/USA): Xlibris, 2013.

Interviews Collected in Published Books 
 Anas Filali, "Raihanyat" (Forty Interviews with Mohamed Said Raihani), Amman/Jordan: Sayel Publishing Co, 1st Edition, 2012.
 Collective Work, "With Raihani in His Shrine" (Thirty Interviews on Culture, Art & Literature with Mohamed Said Raihani), Tetouan/Morocco: Maktabat Salma Al-Thaqafiah, 1st Edition, 2016.

References

External links
Mohamed Saïd Raihani's Site
 Short Stories By Mohamed Saïd Raihani
Mohamed Saïd Raihani Interviewed

1968 births
Living people
Moroccan novelists
Moroccan male writers
Male novelists
Moroccan writers in French
People from Ksar el-Kebir